Shelekhov is a town and the administrative center of Shelekhovsky District in Irkutsk Oblast, Russia, located  southwest of Irkutsk, the administrative center of the oblast. It is located on the plains between the rivers Irkut and Olha. The official day of the city is celebrated on 12 July.

History

Etymology
In 1956, it was named Shelekhov honoring a Russian explorer Grigory Shelikhov. The name of the city is spelled differently from the surname of the explorer as Grigory himself used two different signatures with both spelling variants of his surname. In 1962, Shelekhov was granted town status.

Development
The city was founded in May 1953 when the first construction workers of the Irkutsk Aluminum Smelter had installed the first six housing tents. In memory of these first construction workers, a monument of concrete in the form of tents referred to as "The First Tent" was erected near the administrative building of the plant. However, this year mostly symbolizes first mention of an actual inhabited area as the settlement was then called by the abbreviation of the aluminum plant- IrkAZ, and not Shelekhov.

According to GIPROGOR, a Russian urban planning and investment company, it was initially planned to create a city with a population of 100,000 people. The first inhabitants were the people of the villages Olkha, Markovo, Vvedenschina and the settlement of Bolshoj Lug.

On March 30, 1954, the commission adopted a temporary construction scheme of dwelling houses. In autumn a film projector was launched that held regular movie showings. In October the first ten members of the Komsomol had arrived for the construction of the Irkutsk Aluminum Smelter. By the end of the year 2148m² of living space was commissioned.

Initially, the residential buildings were planned to be divided into different blocks. However currently, the city is represented by several blocks and residential areas.

By the end of 1955 the construction site and the settlement received permanent electric lighting from the grid. In June 1956 the first workers of the Orel Komsomol arrived on train to the site. Over a thousand people were initially housed in a tent city near Kultuk. Given the increase in demand, the first kindergarten was opened on 15 September 1955 and the first high school was opened by the end of 1956.

Administrative and municipal status
Within the framework of administrative divisions, Shelekhov serves as the administrative center of Shelekhovsky District, to which it is directly subordinated. As a municipal division, the town of Shelekhov is incorporated within Shelekhovsky Municipal District as Shelekhovskoye Urban Settlement.

Sports
The Canada-United States match of the 2012 Women's Bandy World Championship was played in Shelekhov. Irkutsk was awarded the 2014 World Championship for men and some of the matches were played in Shelekhov, at the Stroitel Stadium. The town hosted two matches at the 2017 Girls-17 World Championship.

International relations

Twin towns and sister cities
Shelekhov is twinned with:
 Nomi, Japan
 Rylsk, Russia

References

Notes

Sources

Registry of the Administrative-Territorial Formations of Irkutsk Oblast 

Cities and towns in Irkutsk Oblast
Populated places established in 1953
Cities and towns built in the Soviet Union
Monotowns in Russia